Pervomayskoye is a rural locality (a village) in Kaltovsky Selsoviet, Iglinsky District, Bashkortostan, Russia. The population was 76 as of 2010. There is 1 street.

Geography 
Pervomayskoye is located 26 km southeast of Iglino (the district's administrative centre) by road. Budyonnovsky is the nearest rural locality.

References 

Rural localities in Iglinsky District